The Marin County Board of Supervisors is the governing body for the unincorporated areas of Marin County, California in the San Francisco Bay Area's North Bay region. The current board members are Damon Connolly (District 1), Katie Rice (District 2), Stephanie Moulton-Peters (District 3), Dennis Rodoni (District 4), and Judy Arnold (District 5, current President).

The board functions as the authority for the County Free Library system, the Marin County Department of Parks and Open Space, (consisting of the Marin County Parks and Landscape Division and the Marin County Open Space District), Redevelopment Agency, Marin Transit, and County Housing Authority. The board also is in charge of the following services: public works, roads, voter registration, health and welfare programs, courts, district attorney, public defender, jail facilities, recording of official documents. Additionally, one member of the board is appointed to the Sonoma–Marin Area Rail Transit Board of Directors.

As in other counties the board provides municipal services for the unincorporated areas, such as: fire and police protection, planning, zoning, land use regulation, traffic regulation, and parks and recreation.

The board is in charge of enforcing the county code, commanding the Marin County Sheriff's Department, and creating or repealing county ordinances.

The supervisors also help nominate and appoint citizens to 61 different boards which vary from vector abatement, major crimes task force, youth commission, redevelopment councils to Oakland International Airport noise abatement.

Board of Supervisors meetings are held weekly on Tuesdays at 10:00 AM at the Board of Supervisors' Chambers in San Rafael, the seat of Marin County.

The board is against the USA Patriot Act and the Homeland Security Act. The Board of Supervisors is strongly in support of freedom of speech and freedom for its libraries from the government.

Districts and members
District 1 covers the urban area of San Rafael in Marin County. It is represented by Damon Connolly.
District 2 covers Fairfax, San Anselmo, and Ross in central Marin County. It is represented by Katie Rice, after the death of Harold C. Brown.
District 3 covers the areas of Belvedere, Mill Valley, Tirburon, and Sausalito in southern Marin County. It was represented by Charles McGlashan, until his untimely death. On May 22, 2011, California Governor Jerry Brown appointed Kate Sears, then a supervising deputy attorney general, to serve out the late McGlashan's term.
District 4 covers the vast rural areas of West Marin in addition to Larkspur and Corte Madera in east-central Marin along the San Francisco Bay shore. The district also serves portions of Indian Valley, northern, and western Novato. It is represented by Dennis Rodoni.
District 5 covers the areas around Novato in northern Marin County. It is represented by Judy Arnold.

References

External links

Official website

County government in California
Board of Supervisors